Pushpais an oil barge built by Goa Shipyard (yard number 1144) for the Indian Navy.
The ship was delivered on 29 September 1989. The vessel's IMO number is 8612213 and has a deadweight of 732 tonnes.

See also
INS Prema

References

1989 ships
Auxiliary ships of the Indian Navy